Oak Hill in Annandale, Virginia, United States, is a Georgian style home built in 1790.  It was listed on the National Register of Historic Places in 2004.

It was extensively renovated in the 1930s and is significant for its architecture after that renovation.

History
On the night of November 5, 1861, a shootout occurred at Oak Hill between members of the units later involved in the Bog Wallow Ambush, in an area of much probing and patrolling between Union and Confederate forces.   All three of the Fitzhugh estates were protected by orders from both sides throughout the war.

David and Amanda Scheetz purchased the home in 2008, after a foreclosure, for $1.15 million.
The home is open to tours periodically.

References

External links

"Oak Hill Mansion", Wikimapia

Georgian architecture in Virginia
Colonial Revival architecture in Virginia
Houses completed in 1790
Annandale, Virginia
Houses on the National Register of Historic Places in Virginia
Houses in Fairfax County, Virginia
National Register of Historic Places in Fairfax County, Virginia
1790 establishments in Virginia